Justin Miller (November 17, 1888 – January 17, 1973) was an Associate Justice of the United States Court of Appeals for the District of Columbia.

Education and career

Born on November 17, 1888, in Crescent City, California, Miller received an Artium Baccalaureus degree in 1911 from Stanford University, a Bachelor of Laws in 1913 from the Alexander Blewett III School of Law at the University of Montana and a Juris Doctor in 1914 from Stanford Law School. He entered private practice in Hanford, Fresno, and San Francisco, California from 1914 to 1921. He was district attorney for Kings County, California from 1915 to 1918. He was an attorney and executive officer of the California State Commission on Immigration and Housing from 1919 to 1921. He was a Professor of Law at the University of Oregon from 1921 to 1923, at the University of Minnesota from 1923 to 1926, and the University of California from 1926 to 1927. He was Professor and Dean at the USC Gould School of Law from 1927 to 1930. He was Dean at the Duke University School of Law from 1930 to 1935. He was special assistant to the Attorney General of the United States from 1934 to 1936.

Federal judicial service

Miler was a member of the United States Board of Tax Appeals in 1937.

Miler was nominated by President Franklin D. Roosevelt on August 20, 1937, to an Associate Justice seat  on the United States Court of Appeals for the District of Columbia (now the United States Court of Appeals for the District of Columbia Circuit) vacated by Associate Justice Josiah Alexander Van Orsdel. He was confirmed by the United States Senate on August 21, 1937, and received his commission on August 23, 1937. His service terminated on September 30, 1945, due to his resignation.

Post judicial service

Miller was the President of the National Association of Broadcasters from 1945 to 1951. He was Chairman of the Board and general counsel for the National Association of Radio and Television Broadcasters starting in 1951. He was Chairman of the Salary Stabilization Board from 1951 to 1952.

Death

Miller died January 17, 1973.

References

Sources
 

Judges of the United States Court of Appeals for the D.C. Circuit
United States court of appeals judges appointed by Franklin D. Roosevelt
20th-century American judges
Duke University School of Law faculty
1888 births
1973 deaths
People from Crescent City, California
Deans of law schools in the United States
Stanford Law School alumni
Members of the United States Board of Tax Appeals
United States Article I federal judges appointed by Franklin D. Roosevelt